Albert E. Sleeper State Park is a public recreation area on Lake Huron in Lake Township, Huron County, Michigan. The state park encompasses  four miles northeast of  Caseville, close to the tip of The Thumb of Michigan.

History
The park was created in 1925 by Huron County; it became a state park in 1927. The Civilian Conservation Corps was active in the park in the 1940s, building the park's Outdoor Center. In 1944, the park was renamed to honor former Michigan Governor Albert E. Sleeper, who signed the legislation authorizing the state park system.
Economic analysis
According to a 2008 economic impact analysis, Albert E. Sleeper State Park has a significant effect on the economy of the surrounding county, accounting for $5.476 million in direct spending, 144 direct jobs, and $2.881 million in value added. There is additional economic effect from secondary effects, totaling $7.905 million (44.9 percent over direct spending), 181 jobs (25.7 percent over direct job impacts), and $4.396 million (52.6 percent over direct value added).

Activities and amenities
The park's recreational features include a half-mile beach on Saginaw Bay, four miles of trails for hiking, biking and cross-country skiing, picnicking areas, cabins, and campground.

References

External links 
Sleeper State Park Michigan Department of Natural Resources
Sleeper State Park Map Michigan Department of Natural Resources

State parks of Michigan
Protected areas of Huron County, Michigan
Protected areas established in 1925
Saginaw Bay
Civilian Conservation Corps in Michigan
1925 establishments in Michigan
IUCN Category III